Francis Brownell may refer to:

 Francis E. Brownell (1840–1894), Union Army soldier, a Medal of Honor recipient for his  actions during the American Civil War
 Francis H. Brownell (1867–1954), businessman, lawyer, and Washington state pioneer